MS Finlandia may refer to the following ships:

  – a ferry operated by Finland Steamship Company 1967–1975 and Finnlines 1975–1978.
  – a cruiseferry operated by Silja Line 1981–1990.
  – a cruiseferry operated by Eckerö Line 2012-
  – a ro-ro freighter operated by Finnlines 2003 onwards.

Ship names